Katie Patrick (born 14 October 1980) is an Australian-American environmental spokesperson.

Biography
She was raised on Victoria's Mornington Peninsula near Melbourne.

She has a bachelor's degree in environmental engineering from the Royal Melbourne Institute of Technology. She worked in the green building industry on some of Australia's first LEED-certified buildings.

At the age of 24, she founded The Green Pages, Australia's first Green business directory. She was also a proponent of eco fashion in Australia.

She has received several business awards including Cosmopolitan's woman of the year award for the entrepreneur category, Australian Anthill's 30 Under 30 award and Smart Company's 30 Under 30 award.

She is the creator of Zerowastify, an app for reducing municipal solid waste.  She is the author of Detrash Your Life in 90 Days: Your Complete Guide to the Art of Zero Waste Living.

In May 2019, she published How to Save the World, a book about environmental behavior change.

She is president of Hello World Labs, a company focusing on environmental data, behavior change, and game design.  She lives in San Francisco with her daughter Anastasia.

She is the founder of Urban Canopy, a project to reduce urban heat islands.

References

1980 births
Living people
Australian environmentalists
Australian women environmentalists
Australian engineers